Dussourd is a surname. Notable people with the surname include:

 Auguste Dussourd (born 1996), French squash player
 Jean Dussourd (born 1948), French civil servant